Bertolt Brecht was a German poet and playwright.

Brecht may also refer to:
Brecht (name)
Brecht, Belgium, a town in the province of Antwerp, Belgium
Brecht Abbey, a trappist abbey in the same town
Brecht, Germany, a municipality in Rhineland-Palatinate, Germany
Brecht (film), a German film about Bertolt Brecht,  directed by Heinrich Breloer